Spert or SPERT may refer to:

 Thomas Spert (died 1547), English vice admiral in service to King Henry VIII
 Robert Spert, English Member of Parliament for New Shoreham in 1460
 Spert Island, Palmer Archipelago, Antarctica, named after Thomas Spert
 Spert, a subdivision (frazioni) of the comune of Farra d'Alpago, Italy
 Special Power Excursion Reactor Test Program, a series of tests on the safety of nuclear reactors commissioned by the US Atomic Energy Commission in 1954

See also
 Spurt (disambiguation)